Sanford Seacoast Regional Airport  is a public airport located four miles (6 km) southeast of the central business district of Sanford, a town in York County, Maine, United States. The airport operated as Naval Auxiliary Air Facility Sanford (NAAF Sanford, not to be confused with Naval Air Station Sanford, Florida) supporting operations of Naval Air Station Brunswick from 15 April 1943 until 1 February 1946. This airport is now publicly owned by the City of Sanford.

Facilities and aircraft
Runway 7/25: 6,389 x 150 ft (1,947 x 46 m), Surface: Asphalt
Runway 14/32: 4,999 x 100 ft (1,524 x 30 m), Surface: Asphalt

For 12-month period ending 29 August 2006 the airport had 76,010 aircraft operations, an average of 208 per day: 96% general aviation (72,640), 4% air taxi (3,350) and <1% military (20). There are 78 aircraft based at this airport: 92% single engine (72) and 8% multi engine (6).

Fixed-Base Operator and Flight Schools
There is a fixed-base operator (FBO) and several flight schools on the airfield.

The FBO is Southern Maine Aviation, which has Jet Fuel, Aviation Gasoline (100LL) and MoGas (usually available). They also operate an aircraft maintenance facility, a flight school and have facilities for transient flight crew and passengers.

There are three flight schools on the field:
 Southern Maine Aviation provides instruction in single engine airplanes, an American Champion Citabria, several Cessna 172-SPs, a complex Cessna 182 and a RedBird Simulator.
 York County Helicopters provides instruction in Robinson R22s and R44s.
 Sanford Soaring provides instruction in gliders to club members.

History

The Sanford Airport began as an airfield constructed by the Sanford Mills in the 1930s, with a single airstrip and hangar.  With the entry of the United States into World War II in 1941, the airfield was expanded by the United States Navy in 1942 and formally commissioned as Naval Auxiliary Air Facility Sanford in 1943.  It served as one of several secondary airfields to the primary Naval Air Station Brunswick.  Its runway network was enlarged and paved, and barracks and a control tower were built on what is now the southwestern side of the airfield.  A torpedo squadron and a fighter squadron were stationed here in 1944, and the field was used for training exercises.  After the war ended, the facilities were largely mothballed, but remained staffed until the 1960s.  Of the structures built by the Navy, only a hangar and the control tower/administration building survived. The latter, listed on the National Register of Historic Places in 1997, was demolished in 2006–2007 because it was in poor condition and the tower was deemed a hazard to aviation.

In 1955, Colonial Aircraft began production of the Skimmer amphibian in Sanford, Maine. Later in 1959, the type certificate for the Skimmer was sold to the Lake Aircraft Corporation. Lake continued to produce modified versions of the Skimmer in Sanford as the Lake Buckaneer and Lake Renegade until 1994. Six record breaking flights departing from Sanford Airport took place in Lake Renegades piloted by Robert Mann and Peter Foster in 1988 and 1989. The flights set new altitude records for piston amphibians and seaplanes flying to a maximum altitude of 27,300 feet.

See also
National Register of Historic Places listings in York County, Maine

References

External links
Sanford Regional Airport (Town of Sanford web site)

Airports in York County, Maine
Buildings and structures in Sanford, Maine
Military facilities on the National Register of Historic Places in Maine
National Register of Historic Places in York County, Maine